Robotics lab can refer to:

Distributed Robotics Lab
Marquette University Humanoid Engineering & Intelligent Robotics Lab
Mobile Robotics Lab (GCDSL/MRL)
NETES Institute of Technology and Science Mirza Robotics Lab
RobotLAB, an American company